Broadview is a subway station on Line 2 Bloor–Danforth in Toronto, Ontario, Canada. The entrance to the building is from Broadview Avenue just north of Danforth Avenue.

The station, which is the north-eastern terminus of the 504B King and 505 Dundas streetcar routes, has two streetcar platforms and five bus bays to allow riders to transfer between connecting routes. Wi-Fi service is available at this station.

History
Broadview station was opened in 1966 as part of the original segment of the Bloor–Danforth line, from Keele station in the west to Woodbine station in the east. In that same year, the streetcar loop at Broadview station replaced the nearby Erindale Loop formerly located at the corner of Erindale and Broadview avenues.

In 2003, a renovation of the station began, adding an extra streetcar track, additional bus bays, new signage, and elevators/stairways to the platforms, satisfying fire safety requirements for a second exit. The elevators entered service in 2006, and the stairs from the westbound subway to the bus/streetcar platform afterwards. The next stage of the renovation was to build a stairway from the bus/streetcar platform to the eastbound subway platform. This was completed and opened in 2008; however, it was closed shortly afterwards due to water ingress. It has since been re-opened.

In early 2020, the 504 King streetcar platform was extended to accommodate two Flexity Outlook streetcars in order to relieve the queuing of streetcars waiting on the street to enter the station.

Nearby landmarks
The station, located at the east end of the Prince Edward Viaduct, serves the local communities of Playter Estates, Greektown and Riverdale and nearby destinations such as Danforth Music Hall and Riverdale Park.

Parkette

The northwest corner of the station property, which was not required for transit purposes, was leased to the former City of Toronto's Parks Department, since the early 1970s, for use as a public park. During the upgrading of the station facilities in the 2000s, part of the parkette land was required to expand the streetcar platforms and the remainder was used as a staging area during the construction. Subsequently, in 2010 the TTC declared this portion of the site surplus to its operating requirements and the City of Toronto, Parks, Forestry and Recreation agreed to maintain the re-landscaped land for use as a parkette.

Surface connections

When the subway is closed, an on-street transfer is required at the parkette. TTC routes serving the station include:

References

External links

Line 2 Bloor–Danforth stations
Toronto streetcar loops
Railway stations in Canada opened in 1966
Pocket parks